Melanohalea lobulata is a species of foliose lichen in the family Parmeliaceae. Found in the Tibetan Plateau, it was formally described as a new species in 2009 by Fan-Ge Meng and Hai-Ying Wang. Here it was found growing on twigs. Its thallus measures  in diameter, and has a dark brown upper surface. The elongated-ellipsoid lobules that are developed from papillae (little bumps) distinguish M. lobulata from all the other Melanohalea species.

References

lobulata
Lichen species
Lichens described in 2009
Lichens of China